SJUSD may refer to
San Juan Unified School District
San Jose Unified School District
St. Johns Unified School District
Snowline Joint Unified School District
San Jacinto Unified School District